Christian Poncelet (24 March 192811 September 2020) was a conservative French politician.  A member of President Nicolas Sarkozy's Union for a Popular Movement (UMP), he was President of the Senate from 1998 to 2008. In addition to being a Senator, he was Mayor of Remiremont (Vosges) and has been the President of the General Council of Vosges.

Political career
He was elected to the National Assembly in the November 1962 parliamentary election from the Third Constituency of Vosges and was re-elected from the same constituency in the March 1967 parliamentary election and the June 1968 parliamentary election. He served as a deputy until August 1972, when he left his seat following his nomination as a member of the government. He was first elected to the Senate in September 1977, and he was re-elected in September 1986, September 1995, and September 2004, representing Vosges.

On 2 October 1998, Poncelet was elected by the Senate as its President in a third round of voting. The previous President of the Senate, René Monory, had withdrawn after the first round of voting. In the third round, Poncelet received 189 votes against 93 for Socialist candidate Claude Estier and one vote for the withdrawn Communist candidate Hélène Luc.

In 2000, Poncelet was awarded the Grand Cross of the Royal Norwegian Order of Merit.

Following the September 2008 Senate election, it was announced on 24 September that Poncelet would not seek another term as President of the Senate, although he would continue to serve as a Senator. He was succeeded by Gérard Larcher, also from the UMP, on 1 October.

Personal life
Poncelet was born in Blaise (now part of Vouziers) in the Ardennes. 

Poncelet died in Remiremont, on 11 September 2020, at the age of 92.

Political career

Governmental functions

 Secretary of State for Social Affairs: 1972–1973
 Secretary of State for Employment and Population : 1973–1974
 Secretary of State for Public Service : March–May 1974
 Secretary of State for Budget : May 1974 – 1977
 Secretary of State for Parliamentary Relations : April–September 1977 (Became senator in 1977)

Electoral mandates

European Parliament

 Member of the European Parliament : 1979–1980 (resignation). Elected in 1979.

National Assembly

 Member of the National Assembly of France for Vosges : 1962–1972 (Became Secretary of State in 1972). Elected in 1962, re-elected in 1967, 1968, 1973, but he stayed Secretary of State.

Senate

 President of the Senate of France : 1998–2008. Elected in 1998, re-elected in 2001, 2004.
 Président of the Finance Commission of the Senate : 1986–1998.
 Senator of Vosges : Since 1977. Elected in 1977, re-elected in 1986, 1995, 2004.

Regional Council

 Regional councillor of Lorraine : 1977–1992. Elected in 1986?

General Council

 President of the General Council of Vosges : Since 1976. Re-elected in 1979, 1982, 1985, 1988, 1992, 1994, 1998, 2001, 2004, 2008, 2011.
 General councillor of Vosges : Since 1964. Re-elected in 1970, 1976, 1982, 1988, 1994, 2001, 2008.

Municipal Council
 Mayor of Remiremont : 1983-2001. Re-elected in 1989, 1995.
 Deputy Mayor of Remiremont : 1971-1983. Re-elected in 1977.
 Municipal councillor of Remiremont : 1965–2001. Re-elected in 1971, 1977, 1983, 1989, 1995.

References

|-

|-

1928 births
2020 deaths
People from Vouziers
Politicians from Grand Est
Democratic Union of Labour politicians
Union for the New Republic politicians
Union of Democrats for the Republic politicians
Rally for the Republic politicians
Union for a Popular Movement politicians
French Ministers of Budget
Deputies of the 2nd National Assembly of the French Fifth Republic
Deputies of the 3rd National Assembly of the French Fifth Republic
Deputies of the 4th National Assembly of the French Fifth Republic
Deputies of the 5th National Assembly of the French Fifth Republic
French Senators of the Fifth Republic
Senators of Vosges (department)
Presidents of the Senate (France)
French Confederation of Christian Workers members
Members of the Académie des sciences morales et politiques
Grand Crosses of the Order of the Star of Romania